SMK Aminuddin Baki, Kuala Lumpur is a cluster school (SKK), located along Jalan Kampung Pandan, Kuala Lumpur. Established in 1958, approximately 1200 students from Form 1 to Form 5 pursue their secondary education here. The school is also known by its abbreviation SABKL and its students are known as SABians.

History
 1958
 Initially established as Sekolah Menengah Melayu, Kuala Lumpur (Malay Secondary School).
 Temporarily located at the Kampung Baru & Maxwell Primary Schools.
 1963
 Moved to a new temporary location at the Cochrane Secondary School.
 1964
 24 March, moved to the present-day location & changed her name to S.M.K. Aminuddin Baki (Aminuddin Baki National Secondary School).
 1966
 Form 6 classes have been introduced.
 1987
 It was categorised under Controlled Schools.
 1997
 A Daily Hostel was built for students KRK Federal Territory of Kuala Lumpur.
 1998
 Pioneer School TDKT ( Tenaga Diperbaharui & Kecekapan Tenaga)
 1999
 Pioneer Smart School.
 2005
 Offers French language lesson for all students.
 2006
 Sekolah Projek Rintis Sumber Persiaran Terbuka (Open Source Software).
 Pioneer Programme of Microsoft Partners in Learning.
 2007
 30 March, proclaimed Cluster School.
 2010
 Proclaimed High Performance School

Location
Kampung Pandan, Ampang, Kuala Lumpur

School Niches

Swimming
The aquatics team in SABKL is famous for producing swimmers.

English
The school places emphasis towards the enhancement of the student's English language skills by encouraging to participate in various activities and competitions in fields such as:
 Creative Writing
 Public Speaking
 Drama
 Choral Speaking
 Debating

Notable alumni
SABKL has produced successful people in various fields. Among them are:
 Rozali Ismail - Executive Chairman Puncak Niaga Sdn Bhd
 Noh Omar -  Former Cabinet Minister
 Yusof Haslam - Actor, film director, film producer and businessman
 Siti Zainon Ismail - Sasterawan Negara ke 18
 Farhanna Qismina - Actress and TV Host

In popular culture 
 Featured in Gerak Khas in a few episodes about bullying

External links
 Facebook Page
 Twitter Account

Schools in Kuala Lumpur
Secondary schools in Malaysia
Secondary schools in Kuala Lumpur
Educational institutions established in 1958
1958 establishments in Malaya